Horner–Terrill House is a historic home located at Indianapolis, Indiana.  It was built about 1875, and is a -story, roughly "L"-shaped, Second Empire style brick dwelling with limestone detailing. It features a three-story tower, mansard roof, and round arched openings. Also on the property is a contributing garage (c. 1930). It was listed on the National Register of Historic Places in 2013.

References

Houses on the National Register of Historic Places in Indiana
Second Empire architecture in Indiana
Houses completed in 1875
Houses in Indianapolis
National Register of Historic Places in Indianapolis